In the 2018–19 season, Partizani Tirana were competed in the Kategoria Superiore for the sixth consecutive season. The club won the title for the first time since 1992–93 season and for the 16th time total.

Players

Left club during season

Friendlies

Mid-season

Competitions

Overview

Kategoria Superiore

League table

Results summary

Results by round

Matches

Albanian Cup

First round

Second round

Quarter-finals

UEFA Europa League

First qualifying round

Statistics

Top scorers

Last updated: 4 May 2019

Clean sheets
The list is sorted by shirt number when total appearances are equal.

Last updated: 4 May 2019

Notes

References

External links
Official website

Partizani
FK Partizani Tirana seasons
Partizani
Albanian football championship-winning seasons